Kinney Heights is a neighborhood in Los Angeles, California. It is a subdistrict of the West Adams district of South Los Angeles, California.

The area was developed around 1900 by developer Abbot Kinney, for whom it is named. It was a suburban tract of large Craftsman style homes at what was then the western edge of Los Angeles. The homes featured amenities like "beveled-glass china cabinets, marble fireplaces and mahogany floors". It was accessible to downtown via streetcar and attracted upper-middle-class families.

Many of the hundred-year-old homes are still standing and have been renovated and upgraded. The neighborhood is part of the West Adams Terrace Historic Preservation Overlay Zone (HPOZ).

References

Los Angeles Historic Preservation Overlay Zones
Neighborhoods in Los Angeles
West Adams, Los Angeles